Meyathorybia is a genus of moths belonging to the family Tortricidae.

Species
Meyathorybia digitifera Razowski, 2003

See also
List of Tortricidae genera

References

  2003: Polskie Pismo Ent. 72: 72

External links
tortricidae.com

Euliini
Tortricidae genera